Somersault in a Coffin is a 1996 Turkish film, written and directed by Derviş Zaim, about a homeless criminal and car thief.

Cast
Ahmet Uğurlu as Mahsun
Tuncel Kurtiz as  Reis
Aysen Aydemir as  Girl
Mahmut Benek
Ahmet Cediladirci
Barış Celiloğlu

External links 

1996 comedy-drama films
Turkish comedy-drama films
Films set in Turkey
Films shot in Turkey
Films directed by Derviş Zaim
Golden Orange Award for Best Film winners
1996 films
1990s Turkish-language films